Pseudosympycnus is a genus of flies in the family Dolichopodidae. It is distributed in the Neotropical realm.

Species
Species in the genus include:

 Pseudosympycnus albipalpus (Parent, 1930)
 Pseudosympycnus araza Soares & Capellari, 2020
 Pseudosympycnus bickeli Soares & Capellari, 2020
 Pseudosympycnus bicolor Robinson, 1967
 Pseudosympycnus latipes (Parent, 1930)
 Pseudosympycnus latitarsus Soares & Ale-Rocha, 2022
 Pseudosympycnus latitibia Soares & Capellari, 2020
 Pseudosympycnus maroaga Soares & Capellari, 2020
 Pseudosympycnus palpiger (Van Duzee, 1931)
 Pseudosympycnus pennipes Soares & Ale-Rocha, 2022
 Pseudosympycnus perornatus Robinson, 1967
 Pseudosympycnus rafaeli Soares & Ale-Rocha, 2022
 Pseudosympycnus robinsoni Soares & Capellari, 2020
 Pseudosympycnus sehnali Soares & Capellari, 2020
 Pseudosympycnus singularis (Parent, 1934)

References

Dolichopodidae
Dolichopodidae genera
Diptera of North America
Diptera of South America
Taxa named by Harold E. Robinson